Vedran is a Slavic masculine given name of Croatian origin, which is also used among Serbs, Slovenes, and Bosniaks. Vedran means clear or cheerful.

People
Vedran Perič, a Slovenian famous account manager
Vedran Celiščak, a Croatian footballer
Vedran Ćorluka, a Croatian footballer
Vedran Đipalo, a Croatian boxer
 Vedran Hamzić a.k.a. DJ Wedran, a DJ from Bosnia and Herzegovina
Vedran Ivanković, a Bosnian football defender
Vedran Janjetović, an Australian footballer 
Vedran Ješe, a Croatian footballer
Vedran Lalić, a Croatian diplomat
Vedran Kukoč, a Croatian professional football player
Vedran Lovrenčić, winner of Big Brother 4 (Croatia), 2007
Vedran Muratović, a Croatian football player
Vedran Peršić, corporate communication expert from Bosnia and Herzegovina 
Vedran Purić, a Croatian footballer
Vedran Rožić, a former Croatian football player
Vedran Runje, a Croatian football goalkeeper
Vedran Smailović, a musician from Bosnia and Herzegovina
Vedran Turkalj, a Croatian football defender
Vedran Vinko, a Slovenian football striker
Vedran Zrnić, a Croatian handball player

Slavic masculine given names
Croatian masculine given names